Joliet is a city in Will and Kendall counties in the U.S. state of Illinois,  southwest of Chicago. It is the county seat of Will County. At the 2020 census, the city was the third-largest in Illinois, with a population of 150,362.

History

In 1673, Louis Jolliet, along with Father Jacques Marquette, paddled up the Des Plaines River and camped on a huge earthwork mound, a few miles south of present-day Joliet. Maps from Jolliet's exploration of the area showed a large hill or mound down river from Chicago, labeled Mont Joliet. The mound has since been flattened due to mining.

In 1833, following the Black Hawk War, Charles Reed built a cabin along the west side of the Des Plaines River. Across the river in 1834, James B. Campbell, treasurer of the canal commissioners, laid out the village of "Juliet", a corruption of "Joliet" that was also in use at the time. Just before the economic depression of 1837, Juliet incorporated as a village, but to cut tax expenses, Juliet residents soon petitioned the state to rescind that incorporation.

In 1845, local residents changed the community's name from "Juliet" to "Joliet", reflecting the original name. Joliet was reincorporated as a city in 1852. Cornelius Covenhoven Van Horne was active in getting the city its first charter, and because of this, he was elected Joliet's first mayor. When the city later built a new bridge, it was named the Van Horne Bridge.

Geography

It has a sprawling, irregular shape that extends into nine different townships, more than any other Illinois city. They are: Joliet, Plainfield, Troy, New Lenox, Jackson, Channahon, and Lockport in Will County, and Na-Au-Say and Seward in Kendall County. Joliet developed along the Des Plaines River, and its downtown is located in the river valley.

Joliet has a "west side" and "east side", referring to areas in relation to the river.

With the construction of highways and suburban development to the west, many businesses moved from the downtown area to the expanding areas west of the river. Many stores relocated to the west side in new strip malls and shopping centers with more parking and easier access. These changes resulted in the decline of the downtown shopping district, which is still felt today. Today, Joliet has a "west side" and a "far west side" (which includes all city limits in Kendall County). This has given rise to a newly referenced "Central Joliet" portion of the city, which essentially is all land west of the Des Plaines River and east of Interstate 55. This new reference may soon change the current meaning of "west side" to west of I-55.

Climate 
Joliet has a hot summer humid continental climate (Köppen Dfa) with hot, humid summers, and cold winters with moderate to heavy snowfall.

Demographics

2020 census

Note: the US Census treats Hispanic/Latino as an ethnic category. This table excludes Latinos from the racial categories and assigns them to a separate category. Hispanics/Latinos can be of any race.

2010 Census
As of the census of 2010, 147,433 people, 48,019 households, and 34,900 families were residing in the city. The 51,285 housing units averaged 796 per square mile (307.3/km2). The racial makeup of the city was 67.48% White, 15.98% African American, 0.32% Native American, 1.93% Asian, 11.34% from other races, and 2.95% from two or more races. Hispanics or Latinos of any race were 27.84% of the population.

Of the 48,019 households, 30.6% had children under the age of 18 living with them, 53.1% were married couples living together, 14% had a female householder with no husband present, and 27.3% were not families. About 22.1% of all households were made up of individuals, and 7.5% had someone living alone who was 65 years of age or older. The average household size was 3.01, and the average family size was 3.56.

In the city, the population is 30.8% under the age of 18, 9.1% from 18 to 24, 31.6% from 25 to 44, 20.1% from 45 to 64, and 8.4% who were 65 years of age or older. The median age was 31.7 years. For every 100 females, there were 97.8 males. For every 100 females age 18 and over, there were 94.8 males.

For 2015, the median income for a household in the city was $60,976, and for a family was $69,386. Full-time, year-round working males had a median income of $51,082 versus $39,235 for females. The per capita income for the city was $24,374. About 10.4% of families and 12.2% of the population were below the poverty line, including 16.2% of those under age 18 and 8.4% of those age 65 or over.

From April 1, 2010, to July 1, 2011, Joliet was the fastest-growing city in the Midwestern United States and the 18th-fastest growing city in the United States among incorporated places with more than 100,000 people.

Religion

According to the official website for the city of Joliet:
 Joliet's diverse faith community represents over 60 denominations and offers residents services at more than 150 churches, synagogues, and houses of worship. Along with their spiritual offerings, these houses of worship enrich the Joliet area by providing some of the area's finest examples of Romanesque, Gothic, Byzantine, and Renaissance architecture. The spiritual community in Joliet welcomes newcomers with open arms, offering regular worship services and religious education.

Joliet is home to the Roman Catholic Diocese of Joliet, with Bishop Ronald Aldon Hicks. Bishop J. Peter Sartain, former bishop of Joliet, was appointed by Pope Benedict XVI as Archbishop of Seattle and Auxiliary Bishop Joseph M. Siegel was appointed by Pope Francis as Archbishop of Evansville. Joliet holds a very large Catholic population, and many Catholic institutions, including Joliet Catholic Academy.

Economy

Like many Midwestern and East Coast cities dependent on manufacturing industries, Joliet has experienced past economic troubles. , the rate of unemployment in Joliet was around 8.6%. The city is evolving from a steel and manufacturing suburb to a commuter suburb in the Chicago metropolitan area. Some new migrants to the Chicago area are working in bordering Cook County (the nation's second-most populous county) and living in Joliet.

The downtown area of Joliet has slowly attracted new businesses to the area. The main attractions in Joliet's city center are the Harrah's Casino, Joliet Slammers baseball (DuPage Medical Group Field), Hollywood Casino, and the Rialto Square Theatre, also known as the 'Jewel of Joliet', and has been called one of the world's 10 most beautiful theaters. The 1999 film Stir of Echoes starring Kevin Bacon had scenes shot on at the Rialto Square Theatre (the hypnotism scenes in which James saw the word "Dig" on the movie screen), at the corner of Scott Street and Washington, and at the old Menards that took over the Wieboldt's building at Jefferson Square Mall.

The Illinois Youth Center Joliet, a juvenile correctional facility of the Illinois Department of Juvenile Justice, opened in April 1959.

Largest employers
According to the city's 2017 Comprehensive Annual Financial Report, the largest employers in the city are:

Arts and culture

Landmarks

Among local landmarks are the Rialto Square Theatre, the Joliet Area Historical Museum and Route 66 Visitors Center as well as the Chicagoland Speedway (NASCAR) and the Route 66 Raceway (NHRA).

The Joliet Prison is located near Joliet's downtown district on Collins Street. The prison has been featured in both television shows and movies. One such television series filmed there was Prison Break. The prison was also used for the opening scenes in the 1980 movie, The Blues Brothers, which starred John Belushi as "Joliet" Jake Blues and Dan Aykroyd as Elwood Blues.

The first Dairy Queen store opened in Joliet. The location is now occupied by Universal Church.

The Rialto Square Theatre, a favorite haunt of Al Capone and filming location for scenes from Kevin Bacon's film Stir of Echoes, is on Chicago Street, downtown.

Near the theatre, the Joliet Area Historical Museum commemorates the history of Joliet, especially its heritage as a stopping point on U.S. Route 66.

Two casinos originated as riverboat casino in Joliet: the Hollywood Casino near Channahon and a Harrah's hotel and casino downtown. Joliet is the only city in Illinois to have two casinos.

The Louis Joliet Mall is located near the intersection of I-55 and U.S. Route 30.

The Auditorium Building is located at the northeast corner of Chicago and Clinton Streets. Designed by G. Julian Barnes and built of limestone in 1891, it was controversial as one of the first buildings to combine religious, civic, and commercial uses. Nonetheless, people such Theodore Roosevelt visited and spoke at the building. The building was originally built for the Universalist Unitarian Church of Joliet, but the church sold the building in 1993, and it is no longer home to the congregation.

The Jacob A. Henry Mansion, 20 South Eastern Avenue, is a three-story, red-brick, Second Empire/Italian Renaissance-style structure built on a Joliet limestone foundation in 1873 (completed in 1876). The structure is set on bedrock and the entire basement floor is made of Joliet limestone from the building owner's quarry. The walls of the structure are constructed of red Illinois sandstone and deep red brick specially fired in Ohio (wrapped individually and shipped by barge to Joliet). A commanding three-story tower is the focal point of the structure.  The structure has steel trim with slate shingles on a mansard roof. The front and side porches are single slabs of limestone. The largest stone ever quarried lies in the sidewalk under the front entry gate. The stone is 9×22×20 ft. In 1885, an immense Byzantine dome was added to the south façade.

The interior of the Jacob A. Henry Mansion has elaborate polished-walnut woodwork, massive, carved pocket doors, original wood mantles, and a solid-walnut staircase. The original owner, Mr. Henry, was a railroad magnate, building railroads in Indiana, Ohio, and Illinois. He had ownership in a local quarry and was a principal stockholder in Will County National Bank.  The mansion won the architecture award at the American Centennial Celebration in Philadelphia in 1876. The structure is a local landmark, part of the East Side National Register District and individually listed on the National Register of Historic Places.

The former Joliet Arsenal (now the site of both the Abraham Lincoln National Cemetery and the Midewin National Tallgrass Prairie) is in nearby Elwood.

Sports

Joliet is home to three high schools that bear its name: Joliet Central, Joliet West, and Joliet Catholic Academy (JCA), in addition to the closed Joliet East, each of which has sports programs. JCA has been a major football powerhouse for many years and has won more state football titles than any other team in the state, with 14 as of 2018.

Joliet also is home to a minor-league baseball team, the Joliet Slammers of the independent Frontier League. Since the beginning of the 2011 season, they have played their home games at DuPage Medical Group Field.  The Slammers replace the former Joliet JackHammers of the Northern League. The Joliet Slammers won the 2011 Frontier League Championship in their first season as a team.

Chicagoland Speedway hosts annual events from NASCAR. During major races, the large influx of fans means that the number of people in the city is double that of the official figure. Next door to the Speedway, the Route 66 Raceway features National Hot Rod Association events on its drag strip. Joliet Central has become actively involved in Route 66 by building an alternative fuel vehicle. Autobahn Country Club, also located in Joliet, has held the SCCA World Challenge, Atlantic Championship, and Star Mazda Championship races since 2009.

Parks and recreation

Golf courses
Three golf courses are located in the city of Joliet: Inwood Golf Course, Woodruff Golf Course, and Wedgewood Golf Course. Disc golf courses are available at Highland Park and West Park.

Family entertainment

The Pilcher Park Nature Center, located in Pilcher Park, hosts many youth and educational programs. Pilcher Park also contains Native American Indian remains and was the site of a Potowatami Indian village. A burial mound is just south of the entrance on Gougar Road, on the south side of the bridge, and a marked burial plot is inside the park grounds.

Hammel Woods is also located in Joliet with miles of hiking trails and even a seven-acre dog park.

Louis Joliet Mall located on Route 30 in Joliet hosts a large Cinemark theatre

Bicycle trails
Many miles of bike trails wind through Joliet.  The Rock Run and Joliet Junction Trails are roughly north–south routes that begin at the Theodore Marsh in Crest Hill, Illinois, and have southern termini on the I&M Canal State Trail.  These three paths can be used as a 16-mile loop through western Joliet.  The I and M Canal State Trail stretches about 60 miles to Peru, Illinois, for longer bike rides.

Education

As of 2009, almost all public-school students in Joliet attend schools in Joliet Public Schools District 86, Joliet Township High School District 204, Troy Community Consolidated School District 30-C, and Plainfield Community Consolidated School District 202.

Colleges and universities
 Joliet Junior College, the nation's first public community college
 University of St. Francis

High schools
School districts serving Joliet include Joliet Township High School District 204, Plainfield Community Consolidated School District 202, Oswego Community Unit School District 308, and Minooka Community High School District 111.

Joliet area High Schools include Joliet Catholic Academy, Joliet Central High School, and Joliet West High School.

Elementary and middle schools

Elementary and middle school districts serving Joliet include:
 Joliet Public Schools District 86
 Troy Community Consolidated School District 30-C (Also serves neighboring communities of Plainfield, Illinois and Shorewood, Illinois)
Plainfield Community Consolidated School District 202

Career training
Since the early 1980s, the Job Corps of the U.S. Department of Labor has operated the Joliet Job Corps Center on the campus of the former Joliet East High School.

Infrastructure

Transportation

It lies on both sides of the Des Plaines River, a major waterway in Northern Illinois, and was one of the principal ports on the Illinois and Michigan Canal. The Chicago & Rock Island Railroad and Michigan Central came through in the 1850s, and the Atchison, Topeka and Santa Fe Railway and Chicago & Alton Railroad soon followed, with the Elgin, Joliet and Eastern Railway and Milwaukee Road lines built around the turn of the century. U.S. Highways 6 (the Grand Army of the Republic Highway), 30 (the Lincoln Highway), 45, 52, and 66 (Route 66) all ran through the city. In the 1960s, Interstate 55 and Interstate 80 made their way through Joliet, linking up near Channahon just west of the city limits. The phrase "Crossroads of Mid-America", found on the Joliet seal, is an allusion to the intersection of I-80 and I-55.

Joliet Transportation Center is the final stop on the Metra rail lines from Chicago for the Heritage Corridor route from Chicago Union Station and the Rock Island District route from LaSalle Street Station. A third line, the STAR Line, would have also terminated at the station, but the project was shelved as of 2012. PACE provides local bus service six days a week (no service on Sundays) with buses leaving from a terminal in downtown Joliet once an hour. Amtrak serves Joliet Union Station daily via its Lincoln Service and Texas Eagle routes. Service consists of four Lincoln Service round-trips between Chicago and St. Louis, and one Texas Eagle round-trip between San Antonio and Chicago. Three days a week, the Eagle continues on to Los Angeles.

Airports
The Joliet Regional Airport is located off Jefferson Street near Interstate 55. Lewis University Airport is located to the north in the nearby village of Romeoville and is owned by the Joliet Regional Port District.

Major highways
Major highways in Joliet include:

Interstate Highways
 Interstate 55
 Interstate 80

US Highways
 US 6
 US 30
 US 52
 US 66

Illinois Highways
 Route 7
 Route 53
 Route 59
 Route 171

Hospitals
Joliet currently has one hospital within its city limits: Presence Saint Joseph Medical Center (also known as St. Joe's), located on the west side. Silver Cross Hospital, now located in neighboring New Lenox, was located on Joliet's east side. These were the only two hospitals in the history of the existence of Will County until AMITA Bolingbrook Adventist Hospital opened in January 2008. In September 2008, Silver Cross Hospital broke ground for a new facility on Maple Road (U.S. Route 6) in New Lenox, immediately west of Interstate 355.  All patients were transferred to the new hospital on February 26, 2012, and the old facility was completely vacated and later demolished.

Notable people

In popular culture
In the 1973 Academy Award-winning film, The Sting, the protagonist Johnny Hooker is from Joliet and the film begins with a title card reading "Joliet, Illinois / September 1936."

In The Blues Brothers, John Belushi's Jake Blues is nicknamed "Joliet Jake" as he was imprisoned at the now closed Joliet Correctional Center. The Joliet Prison has been a site for many other films and television shows, such as the film Let's Go to Prison, and the opening season of Fox's Prison Break was filmed predominately at the Joliet Prison, at which time part of the prison was still in use.

It is one of the settings in Alice Munro's "Illinois", a short story in her collection The View from Castle Rock.

See also

 List of cities in Illinois
 List of Midwestern cities by size
 List of United States cities by population
 List of U.S. states' largest cities by population

References

External links

 
 The History of Joliet, Illinois
 HistoricBridges.org – Historic Bridges of Will County, Illinois

 
1834 establishments in Illinois
Cities in Illinois
Cities in Kendall County, Illinois
Cities in Will County, Illinois
County seats in Illinois
Populated places established in 1834
Majority-minority cities and towns in Will County, Illinois
Majority-minority cities and towns in Kendall County, Illinois